James Fulton may refer to:

 James Fulton (Canadian politician) (1950–2008), member of the Parliament of Canada
 James G. Fulton (1903–1971), member of the U.S. House of Representatives
 James M. Fulton (1873–1940), American composer and bandleader
 Sir Forrest Fulton (James Forrest Fulton, 1845–1925), British judge and Member of Parliament (MP) for West Ham North 1886–1892
 James Fulton (New Zealand politician) (1830–1891), New Zealand politician and cricketer
 James Fulton (English cricketer) (born 1977), English cricketer
 James Fulton (trade unionist) (1868–1925), Scottish trade union leader
 Judge Fulton (1739–1826), judge and founder of Bass River, Nova Scotia
 James Fulton (dermatologist) (1940–2013), American dermatologist and medical researcher
 James Fulton (civil engineer) (1854–1928), New Zealand surveyor and civil engineer
 James Fulton (co-driver) (1992–), Irish rally co-driver